Lamesley is a village and civil parish in the Metropolitan Borough of Gateshead, Tyne and Wear, England. The population of the civil parish at the 2011 census was 3,742. The village is on the southern outskirts of Gateshead, near to Birtley. The parish includes Kibblesworth, Lamesley village, Eighton Banks and Northside, Birtley which is predominantly private housing in neighbourhoods named The Hollys, Long Bank, Northdene and Crathie. The ruined Ravensworth Castle is also in Lamesley.

A hilltop contemporary sculpture in the parish is the Angel of the North by Anthony Gormley on a minor hilltop which is lower than  the adjoining Low Fell and High Fell outside the parish.

Demography
Combined, this area has a population of 3,928 people as at the 2001 census and unlike the small rise in the overall region saw a decrease to 3,742 at the following census. The Gateshead MBC ward of Lamesley had a population of 8,662 at the 2011 Census. Both the ward and civil parish are very homogenous. For instance, in the 2011 Census, the ward was 96.9% White British.

The Ravensworth Arms in Lamesley is said to be where Lewis Carroll wrote parts of Alice in Wonderland.

References

External links

Villages in Tyne and Wear
Civil parishes in Tyne and Wear
Gateshead